Peterson is an unincorporated community in Tuscaloosa County, Alabama, United States. Peterson has a post office with ZIP code 35478. Peterson was originally known as Peterson City, in honor of Charles M. Peterson, who purchased land in the surrounding area.

References

Unincorporated communities in Tuscaloosa County, Alabama
Unincorporated communities in Alabama